Slope is the debut solo album by drummer Steve Jansen, released in 2007 by Samadhi Sound. The album includes  guest musicians and was recorded all over the world.

Jansen said: "With this album I approached composition attempting to avoid chord and song structures and the usual familiar building blocks. Instead I wanted to piece together unrelated sounds, music samples, rhythms and 'events' in an attempt to deviate from my own trappings as a musician."

Track listing
 "Grip" (Jansen) 6:42
 "Sleepyard" (Jansen, Tim Elsenburg) 5:13
 "Cancelled Pieces" (Jansen, Anja Garbarek) 3:20
 "December Train" (Jansen) 4:14
 "Sow the Salt" (Jansen, Thomas Feiner) 5:49
 "Gap of Cloud" (Jansen) 2:45
 "Playground Martyrs" (Jansen, David Sylvian) 3:02
 "A Way of Disappearing" (Jansen) 1:57
 "Ballad of a Deadman" (Jansen, Sylvian) 6:25
 "Conversation Over" (Jansen) 5:07
 "Life Moves On" (Jansen) 2:25
 "Playground Martyrs (Reprise)" (Jansen, Sylvian) 3:01

Personnel
Steve Jansen - drums, acoustic and electronic percussion, sampled instruments, synth, piano (5—8, 11–12), guitar (5, 9), string arrangements (7, 9, 11–12)
David Sylvian - guitar (3, 9), vocals (7, 9)
Theo Travis - sax (1, 2, 10), flute (6, 9), clarinet (8)
Tim Elsenburg - vocals, guitar and electric piano (2)
Anja Garbarek - vocals (3)
Thomas Feiner - vocals, mandolin and sampler (5)
Bratislava Movie Orchestra, arranged and conducted by Ingo Frenzel (5)
Joan Wasser - vocals and violin (9)
Alberto Tafuri - piano ("Second Piano Cycle") (11)
Nina Kinert -  vocals (12)
Production
Recorded by Steve Jansen and parts by Steve D'Agostino, David Sylvian (himself), Tim Elsenburg (himself), John Mallison (Anja Garbarek), Ján Machut and Ladislav Krajãoviã (orchestra), Bryce Goggin (Joan Wasser), Alberto Tafuri (himself in 1985), Love Olzon (Nina Kinert)
Mixed by Steve Jansen (exc. orchestra mixed by Ingo Frenzel)
Mastered by Tony Cousins     
Cover art direction by David Sylvian
Cover design by Chris Bigg
Models created and photographed by Dan McPharlin

References

External links
 Official site

2007 debut albums
Steve Jansen albums
Samadhi Sound albums